The Butterworth Prize for Composition, named in honour of English composer George Butterworth (1885-1916), was awarded by the Society for the Promotion of New Music annually between 1993 and 2008. It is now awarded annually by Sound and Music, and there are also Butterworth Prizes for Law and for Literature.

Winners
 Richard Causton (1993)
 Hywel Davies
 Peter McGarr
 Michael Gorodecki (1993), with Music for Andrei (organ solo)
 David Prior (1998)
 Cameron Sinclair
 Sohrab Uduman
 Gavin Thomas (1995)
 Jeremy Thurlow (2007)
 Raymond Yiu (2003)
 Brahim Kerkour (2013)
 Nathaniel Mann (2014) for pigeon whistles
 Paul McGuire (2015), for Panels
 Pia Palme (2016)
 Sarah Lianne Lewis (2018)
 Blasio Kavuma (2019)

References

Lists of award winners
Lists of composers
British music awards